"Shades" is the first single by the American singer-songwriter Alexandra Savior. It was released on June 17, 2016, by Columbia Records as the first single from Belladonna of Sadness.

Personnel
 Alexandra Savior – lead vocals
 Alex Turner – guitars, bass guitar, keyboards, synthesizers
 James Ford – keyboards, synthesizers, drums, percussion

References

2016 songs
Alexandra Savior songs
Songs written by Alex Turner (musician)
Columbia Records singles
Song recordings produced by James Ford (musician)
Songs written by Alexandra Savior